Jacquie Beltrao (born Jacqueline Leavy on 21 April 1965 in Dublin) is a sports presenter on Sky News and a former Olympic gymnast.

Early life and career

Born in Dublin, Ireland, she grew up in Coventry, England. She studied sports science at Birmingham University, and represented Great Britain in rhythmic gymnastics at the 1984 Olympic Games in Los Angeles, placing 31st in the All-Around.

She joined Sky News in 1992, where she first worked as a publicist before later becoming a sports reporter and presenter. She now presents updates on weekends (Friday to Sunday ) during Sunrise and for the first hour of the following programme.

Personal life

She is a supporter of Arsenal and of Celtic and the Republic of Ireland national football team. She also has a strong passion for tennis and has done many news reports on the sport for Sky News and Sky Sports News.

She lives with her husband Eduardo Beltrao and three children in South West London. The family also own a holiday home in Rio de Janeiro, Brazil. The family have three rescue dogs, after she appeared on Sky News representing Dogs Trust.

On 31 December 2013, Beltrao announced she was diagnosed with breast cancer on Christmas Eve.

On 26 June 2020, Beltrao announced on social media her breast cancer had returned and consequently had time away from presenting Sky Sports.

References

External links 
 
 California Dreaming Sky News, 19 August 2008 (Retrieved on 20 August 2008)

1965 births
Living people
Sportspeople from County Dublin
Sportspeople from Coventry
Alumni of the University of Birmingham
British rhythmic gymnasts
Olympic gymnasts of Great Britain
Gymnasts at the 1984 Summer Olympics
Sky Sports presenters and reporters
British women television journalists
Sky News newsreaders and journalists
Irish gymnasts